Cotton leaf curl viruses (CLCuV) are a number of plant pathogenic virus species of the family Geminiviridae.

In Asia and Africa the major disease of cotton is caused by the Cotton leaf curl geminivirus (CLCuV). Leaves of infected cotton curl upward and bear leaf-like enations on the underside along with vein thickening. Plants infected early in the season are stunted and yield is reduced drastically. (A. Nadeem and Z. Xiong, University of Arizona) This virus devastated the Pakistan cotton industry in early 1990s where it caused an estimated yield reduction of 30-35%.

Description
All Begomovirus species causing cotton leaf curl disease have geminate particles, approximately 18-20 nm in diameter and 30 nm long and a circular, single-stranded DNA genome. All except Cotton leaf crumple virus have a monopartite genome, with all viral products required for replication, systemic movement and whitefly transmission encoded on a single DNA component of c. 2.75 kB (DNA A). The genome of CLCrV is bipartite. Two smaller, circular, single-stranded DNA molecules, named DNA 1 and DNA β, are associated with a range of monopartite begomoviruses from the Old World including the cotton leaf curl viruses. These molecules are regarded as satellite molecules as they depend on the helper begomovirus to support one or more stages of their infection cycle (movement and insect transmission for both molecules and, additionally, replication in the case of DNA β). DNA β is symptom-modulating and typical cotton leaf curl disease symptoms only develop when this molecule is present: in the absence of DNA β, the concentration of viral DNA (DNA A) is low and the symptoms of infection very mild. DNA β has a single open reading frame (βC1 ORF), which encodes a suppressor of RNA silencing. DNA 1 is homologous to the DNA-R component of the nanoviruses and encodes a master replication initiator (M-Rep) protein but its presence does not alter symptom expression. (Corresponding author: Dr Andrew Geering 2007)
The plant resistance to against CLCuV was described by Ali (1997, 1999) that the CLCuV resistance was controlled by single dominate gene, and could be transferred to any cultivar by using back cross technique.

Prevention and control
Use resistant or tolerant cultivars
Protect seedlings from whiteflies
Use only good seeds and healthy transplants
Control whiteflies
Immediately remove infected-looking plants and bury them
Control weeds
Do not plant cotton near tomato and/or other crops susceptible to whiteflies or vice
Use acephate-imidacloprid at 50% - 1.8% respectively, at every seven days.
Plow-under all plant debris after harvest or burn them when possible
Practice crop rotation by planting crops that are not susceptible to whitefly

References
Xiong, Z.; Nadeem, A.; Weng, Z.; Nelson, M. (2004): Cotton leaf curl virus is distinct from cotton leaf crumple virus. Department of Plant Pathology, University of Arizona.
Corresponding author: DrAndrew Geering (2007) Cotton leaf curl Multan virus and others genus Begomovirus, family Geminiviridae, retrieved November 15, 2007
Xie Y, Liu Y*, Meng M, Chen L and Zhu Z*.  Isolation and identification of a super strong plant promoter from cotton leaf curl Multan virus, Plant Molecular biology, Plant Molecular Biology 53(1), 1-14, 2003 (*corresponding author)
Leaf curl virus. (n.d)., retrieved November 15, 2007
Dr. Mahboob Ali and Dr. Zahoor Ahmed Journal of Research (Science), Bahauddin Zakariya University, Multan, Pakistan 2004 çPDF)

External links
ICTVdB - The Universal Virus Database: Cotton leaf curl virus

Begomovirus
Viral plant pathogens and diseases
Unaccepted virus taxa